Sol de América (Spanish for Sun of the Americas) may refer to:

 Club Sol de América, a Paraguayan sports club
 Sol América, an airline based in Caracas